The Black Flux is the second studio album by Norwegian avant-garde metal band Virus. It was released on 10 November 2008 via Season of Mist.

Background
The Black Flux was recorded between June 2007 and July 2008 at Amper Tone Studios in Oslo.

This is the band's only studio album that was released by the label Season of Mist.

Track listing

Critical reception

The album received generally positive reviews. AllMusic reviewer Greg Prato stated: "Most times, this Oslo, Norway-based outfit sounds comparable to Voivod, but at other times sound like a distant musical disciple of the Melvins (with far less distortion on the guitar and more discernible vocals). Either way, one thing's for certain. These chaps like to stretch a guitar part until your brain goes numb, as evidenced by the album's title track, which rambles on for nearly three minutes before the vocals finally kick in. Elsewhere, a tune like "Lost Peacocks" cuts to the chase quicker when it comes to the vocals, with a singing style (courtesy of Virus' singer/guitarist, Czral) that sounds patterned after the late/great Ian Curtis from Joy Division."

Personnel

Virus
 Czral — vocals, guitars
 Plenum — bass
 Einz — drums
Additional personnel
 Bård Ingebrigtsen — baritone guitar, violin, piano, slide guitar, effects, production
 B9 — soundscapes, ambience (tracks 3, 5)

Other staff
 Tom Kvålsvoll — mastering
 Sapfo Stavrides — photography
 Kvohst — lyrics

References

2008 albums
Virus (Norwegian band) albums
Season of Mist albums